"Somebody Help Me" is a single by The Spencer Davis Group, which was released in 1966. As with "Keep on Running", it was composed by Jackie Edwards.

Chart performance
"Somebody Help Me" became the band's second consecutive and last number-one hit in the UK Singles Chart, staying at the summit for two weeks in April 1966. In the US, the song peaked at number 47 in July 1967.

Cover Versions
The Everly Brothers also released a version on their album Two Yanks in England, released in mid 1966.

Song in Popular Culture
It was used as the theme tune to the 1960s-era hospital-based ITV drama series The Royal, which ran from 2003 to 2011, and its short-lived spin-off The Royal Today, which first aired in 2008.

References

1966 singles
The Spencer Davis Group songs
The Everly Brothers songs
UK Singles Chart number-one singles